A cabbage roll is a dish consisting of cooked cabbage leaves wrapped around a variety of fillings. It is common to the cuisines of Central, Northern, Eastern and Southeastern Europe and much of Western Asia, Northern China, as well as parts of North Africa.
Meat fillings are traditional in Europe, and include beef, lamb, or pork seasoned with garlic, onion, and spices. Grains such as rice and barley, mushrooms, and vegetables are often included as well. Fermented cabbage leaves are used for wrapping, particularly in southeastern Europe. In Asia, seafoods, tofu, and shiitake mushrooms may also be used. Chinese cabbage is often used as a wrapping.

Cabbage leaves are stuffed with the filling which are then baked, simmered, or steamed in a covered pot and generally eaten warm, often accompanied with a sauce. The sauce varies widely by cuisine. In Sweden and Finland, stuffed cabbage is served with lingonberry jam, which is both sweet and tart. In Central and Eastern Europe, tomato-based sauces and sour cream are typical. In Lebanon, the cabbage is stuffed with rice and minced meat and only rolled to the size of a cigar. It is usually served with a side dish of yogurt and a type of lemon and olive oil vinaigrette seasoned with garlic and dried mint.

The cabbage roll is a staple in the Hungarian and Romanian cuisine with variations of the recipe and sizing depending on the region, typically taking up to 6 hours to cook. Traditionally made with pork, beef, bacon, rice, spices and aromatics, broiled in a tomato sauce and served with polenta, sour cream and spicy pickled peppers.

Cooking textbook author Nancy Krcek stated that the origins are unclear and that it is possible multiple groups of people invented it at the same time. A version called holishkes is traditionally eaten by Jews on Simchat Torah; Gil Marks described stuffed cabbage to have entered Jewish cooking some 2,000 years ago. Recipes vary depending on region; northern Poles prefer a savory sauce, while Galicia, Hungary and Ukraine favor sweet-and-sour, for example.

Variations

 Lahanodolmades (Λαχανοντολμάδες) – Greece
 Töltött káposzta / Szárma – Hungary
 Balandėliai (little pigeons) – Lithuania
 Halubcy – Belarus
 Golubtsy (little pigeons) – Russia
 Gołąbki (little pigeons) – Poland
 Holubtsi - (little pigeons) – Ukraine
 Kāpostu tīteņi – Latvia
 Holubky – Czech Republic and Slovakia
 Holishkes – Ashkenazi Jewish
 Prakas – Ashkenazi Jewish
 Krouv Memula – Israel
 Kåldolmar – Sweden
 Kaalikääryle – Finland
 Kapsarull – Estonia
 Japrak or Sarma (Sarma me lakër të bardhë) – Albania
 Сарма (Sarma) – North Macedonia
 Сарма / Sarma – Serbia
 Sarma / Сарма or Japrak / Јапрак – Bosnia and Herzegovina
 Punjeni kupus or Arambašići or Sarma – Croatia
 Сарми (Sarmi; see: Sarma) – Bulgaria
 Sarmale – Romania, Moldova
 Sarma – Southeastern Europe and Turkey
 Lahana dolması/sarması – Turkey
 Kələm dolması – Azerbaijan
 Kaghambi tolma (կաղամբի տոլմա) – Armenia
 Tolma (ტოლმა) – Georgia
 Dolmeye Kalam (cabbage dolma) – Iran
 Malfoof mahshi (محشي ملفوف) – the Levant
 Mahshi kuronb (محشي كرنب) – Egypt and Sudan
  and Krautwickel – Germany and Austria
 Cigares au chou – Quebec
 Involtini di cavolo – Italy
 Capuns – Graubunden, Switzerland and Lombardy, Italy
 Capunet - Veneto, Italy
 Bragioli – Malta
 Niños Envueltos – Argentina and Uruguay
 Charuto de Repolho – Brazil
 Aluske – Paraná, Santa Catarina, and Rio Grande do Sul (Brazil)
 Bai Cai Juan (白菜卷) – China
 Rōru kyabetsu (ロールキャベツ) – Japan
  – Vietnam

Europe
Azerbaijan and Turkey

Stuffed cabbage leaves are popular all year in Azerbaijan and Turkey, but especially in winter when other vegetables are less plentiful. The stuffing usually consists of rice and herbs such as coriander, mint and dill, onions and meat, although there is a variation—yalancı (fake) dolma—which is meat-free.

 Balkans 

Cabbage rolls are a culinary standard in Montenegro, Bosnia and Herzegovina, Turkey, Bulgaria, Macedonia, Romania, Serbia and Croatia. Leaves of brined cabbage stuffed with ground beef, pork and rice are a favorite dish during Christmas time and other non-fasting holidays, while meat is omitted or substituted with crushed walnuts on fasting holy days. Traditionally, cabbage rolls are simmered at length in a paprika-based sauce with chunks of smoked bacon.

 Romania and Moldova 

With sarmale being the national dish of Romania, come different variations and sizing depending on the region.
Sarmale are Romanian stuffed cabbage rolls traditionally served on Christmas and New Year's Eve but also served throughout the year at weddings, baptism parties, and other large celebrations. It is considered a winter dish and starts with the orthodox celebration of St. Ignatie day – Preparing the Pig, when Romanians traditionally slaughter the pigs for Christmas. 
Ground pork or beef is mixed with sauteed caramelized onions and rice, stuffed in a cabbage leaf, pickled sauerkraut leaf or grape leaf. For flavor, they usually consist of layers with bacon, smoked ribs, or smoked sausage. 
Seasoned with spices and aromatics, it is traditionally served with polenta, sour cream and pickled spicy peppers.

 Hungary 
The traditional Hungarian cabbage roll (töltött káposzta) can be made from sweet or sauerkraut cabbage leaves filled with a mixture of minced pork meat, eggs, and rice seasoned with paprika, caraway, salt, and pepper. The Hungarian version often contains minced pepper (paprika) and is served with sour cream on top. Many Hungarians serve this food during Christmas and New Year's Eve, although it is a common dish throughout the year (sweet version during summer/fall and the sour during winter/spring time). The sour stuffed cabbage is part of the traditional Hungarian pig slaughter menu and it is said that eating this during the holiday season will bring you wealth and health for the new year.

 Poland 

Stuffed cabbage rolls are a popular Polish dish. Pork and beef mixed with rice or barley are nestled in a cabbage leaf and cooked in the oven or on the stove until tender.

The name gołąbki means "little pigeons" in Polish. The cabbage rolls are called holubky by Czechs and Slovaks, or sarma / сарма by Serbs, Croatians and Bulgarians. The sauce is often the main difference in regional variations.
In a less popular version called leniwe gołąbki (lazy cabbage rolls) the ingredients are chopped, combined and baked or fried.

Ukraine
In Ukraine, the filling of holubtsi varies throughout the country. In the Carpathian region corn grits are used, whereas in the Poltava area buckwheat groats are preferred. The cereal is lightly cooked, mixed with fried onions, shkvarky (pork cracklings) or raw minced meat. The mixture is combined with spices and seasonings, and is then used as the filling for steamed fresh or pickled cabbage leaves. In spring cabbage leaves are often replaced with fresh beetroot leaves, and in the southwest – with fresh young grape leaves. The holubtsi are lightly fried and then stewed with sour cream, or tomato, mushroom or some other sauce. During Lenten periods this might be water mixed with kvas, while at other times it might be a meat broth.

In Left Bank Ukraine and in the south, holubtsi are usually big, made from the entire cabbage leaf, while in the Dniester region and the Carpathians the cabbage leaf is divided into several pieces. In the latter regions, cooks who made large holubtsi were considered lazy. In Poltava cooks preferred the large holubtsi because they were juicier. In most of Ukraine holubtsi were an everyday dish, but in most of Right Bank Ukraine, with the exception of Polissia, they were also included in holiday meals. Beginning in the 1920s, holubtsi began to be stuffed with a rice-meat mixture, and, instead of kvas, they began to be cooked in tomato juice, sauce or paste. This is the most common way they are prepared nowadays.

Holubtsi are a popular dish for both everyday meal and as special occasion treat. For Sviata Vecheria (Christmas Eve Supper) in many regions of Ukraine holubtsi constitute one of the twelve traditional dishes served on the night. Only Lenten ingredients are used in this case.Faryna, Natalka (Ed.) 1976, Ukrainian Canadiana, Ukrainian Women's Association of Canada, Edmonton On occasion of Sviata Vecheria, Boykos and Transcarpathians make Holubtsi from "kryzhavky" (pickled whole heads of cabbage). Into these "pickled" holubtsi they put a stuffing of rice and mushrooms. Carpathian-style holubtsi are usually made from fresh cabbage and stuffed with corn grits, or with grated raw potato (Vorokhta, Verkhovyna, Kvasy). These are best served with mushroom gravy.  To differentiate the different types of holubtsi, they are wrapped into different shapes: corn-filled ones are made into the shape of envelopes, with the edges folded in, potato-filled are simply rolled up. A classic Halychian (Galician) Sviata Vecheria dish is holubtsi stuffed with grated potato and served with a mushroom machanka (dipping sauce).

 Russia 
The Russian version of cabbage rolls usually consists of mincemeat mixed with cooked rice or buckwheat wrapped in cabbage leaves and stewed in a mixture of sour cream and tomato sauce. In order to save time there is another variation of that dish called lenivye golubtsy (lazy cabbage rolls). In that case, the cabbage is chopped and mixed with mincemeat and rice so there is no need to wrap every meatball in a cabbage leaf.

Sweden and FinlandKåldolmar ("cabbage dolma") are Swedish cabbage rolls filled with rice and minced meat (most often pork). They are traditionally eaten with boiled or mashed potatoes, gravy, and lingonberry jam. In Finland the same dish is known as kaalikääryle (plural kaalikääryleet).

In 1709, after losing the Battle of Poltava, the wounded Charles XII of Sweden and the remnants of his army escaped with their Cossack allies to the Ottoman town of Bender, in present-day Moldavia, where they were granted refuge by Sultan Ahmed III. Charles XII spent more than five years in the Ottoman Empire, trying to convince the Sultan to help him defeat the Russians. When he finally returned to Sweden in 1715, he was followed by his Ottoman creditors and their cooks. The creditors remained in Sweden at least until 1732; it is generally believed that Ottoman style dolma were introduced into Swedish cooking during this period.

As indicated by the name, Swedish kåldolmar are generally considered a variety of the dolma. Swedish is the only European language to use the Turkish term dolma ("filled") to denote cabbage rolls.

The earliest known Swedish recipe for "Dolma" is in the 1765 edition of the famous cookbook of Cajsa Warg. Warg instructed her readers to prepare the rolls using vine leaves, lamb, rice, and lemon juice. Toward the end of the recipe, however, Warg suggested that those who could not afford vine leaves could use preboiled cabbage leaves in their place. Nowadays, frozen kåldolmar, cooked with preboiled cabbage leaves, are sold in most major food stores in Sweden.

To cherish early modern cultural interchange between Sweden and the Orient, the Cabbage Dolma Day (Kåldolmens dag) is celebrated on November 30, the day Charles XII was killed during a military campaign in Norway. The celebrations were instated in 2010 by a group known as the Friends of the Cabbage Dolma (Kåldolmens vänner). In a series of media appearances, historian Petter Hellström explained that the group wanted to make November 30 a day to remember and ponder the multifaceted roots of Sweden's cultural heritage, apparently in contrast to the same day's long history as the unofficial marching day of Swedish fascism and right wing extremism. Starting in 2013, the Cabbage Dolma Day was hosted by the Swedish History Museum in Stockholm, the country's foremost historical museum. The celebrations have also been supported by a number of important civil society organizations over the years, notably the Church of Sweden and the Federation of Local History and Folk Culture (Sveriges hembygdsförbund).

Africa
Egypt

In Egyptian cuisine, cabbage rolls are called محشي كرمب, pronounced maḥshī kromb or maḥshī koronb (as Standard Arabic [m] often turns to [n] in proximity to [b] in Egyptian Arabic), literally translating to "stuffed cabbage". The leaves are fresh and commonly cut into smaller pieces and partially pre-cooked. The most common filling is a mixture of rice, onion, tomato, herbs, and spices (most typically including mint, dill, and cumin); meat is rarely used in Egyptian stuffed cabbage. The rolls are arranged in a pot and boiled in broth or tomato-based sauce, also including the herbs and spices. As the pieces of cabbage and therefore the rolls are small, the leaves are usually simply rolled around the filling almost like a small cigar, and are left open at the ends rather than folded around the filling to produce a completely enclosed package.

 Americas 

United States
In regions heavily influenced by Polish immigrants, such as Chicago which claims the largest Polish population outside of Poland, Detroit, Pennsylvania, the southern tier of New York, and northeastern Ohio, the term usually refers instead to stuffed cabbage rolls, such as the Polish gołąbki. These are also known as pigs in a blanket. Jewish immigrants from Eastern Europe popularized the dish in New York City, where they became known as Jewish cabbage.

Cabbage rolls also feature prominently in the cuisines of Cajuns and Louisiana Creoles of southern Louisiana, where they usually take the form of ground pork mixed with rice and chopped vegetables stuffed into parboiled cabbage leaves and cooked in a tomato sauce-based liquid.

Romani Americans, Chinese Americans and Vietnamese Americans often cook cabbage rolls.

Asia
China
In Chinese cuisine, cabbage rolls are called 白菜卷, pronounced báicài juǎn.

See also
 List of cabbage dishes
 List of stuffed dishes
 Vine leaf roll

Notes

References

 Wretman, Tore: Svensk husmanskost'' (Forum 1967). .

Stuffed vegetable dishes
Arab cuisine
Argentine cuisine
Armenian cuisine
Ashkenazi Jewish cuisine
Austrian cuisine
Azerbaijani cuisine
Belarusian cuisine
Bulgarian cuisine
Chilean cuisine
Chinese cuisine
Czech cuisine
Finnish cuisine
German cuisine
Hungarian cuisine
Israeli cuisine
Jordanian cuisine
Japanese cuisine
Korean cuisine
Lithuanian cuisine
Lenten foods
Moldovan cuisine
Palestinian cuisine
Polish cuisine
Lebanese cuisine
Levantine cuisine
Romanian cuisine
Russian cuisine
Slavic cuisine
Slovak cuisine
Swedish cuisine
Syrian cuisine
Turkish cuisine
Ukrainian cuisine
Vietnamese cuisine
Culture of Cleveland
World cuisine
Cabbage dishes
Jewish cuisine
Cuisine of the Mid-Atlantic states
Cuisine of the Midwestern United States
Louisiana cuisine
Types of food
Romani cuisine